The 1911–12 Colgate Raiders men's basketball team represented Colgate University during the 1911–12 college men's basketball season. The head coach was Ellery Huntington Sr. coaching the Raiders in his 12th season. The team had finished with a final record of 7–6. The team captain was Harry Collins.

Schedule

|-

References

Colgate Raiders men's basketball seasons
Colgate
Colgate
Colgate